Georgi Ivanovich Kulikov (9 June 1924 — 24 December 1995) was a Russian actor. He appeared in more than forty films from 1955 to 1990.

As a young man in the summer of 1941, Kulikov found work as a welder and a tractor driver, while managing to assemble a theatrical education, studying with fellow young actor Nikolai Rybnikov, eventually graduating from the Mikhail Shchepkin Higher Theatre School in 1948.  His career encompassed theater, films, radio, and teaching drama from 1971 to 1978.   Kulikov was named a Merited Artist of the Russian Federation in April 1967, and after his death on Christmas Eve, 1995, was buried in Moscow's Troyekurovskoye Cemetery.

Filmography

References

External links 

 Georgi Kulikov at the KinoPoisk

1924 births
1995 deaths
Male actors from Moscow
Soviet male stage actors
Russian male stage actors
Soviet male film actors
Russian male film actors
Burials in Troyekurovskoye Cemetery
Honored Artists of the RSFSR